The 2005 CONCACAF U17 Tournament was played in Costa Rica and Mexico.

Qualification

Final round

Squads

Group A

Standings

 USA qualified to the 2005 FIFA U-17 World Championship in Peru.
 Costa Rica forced to play against second place of Group B.

Group B

Standings

 Mexico qualified to the 2005 FIFA U-17 World Championship in Peru.
 Honduras forced to play against second place of Group A.

Playoff

 Costa Rica won 3 - 2 on aggregate and qualified to the 2005 FIFA U-17 World Championship in Peru.

 
2005
U-17
International association football competitions hosted by Costa Rica
International association football competitions hosted by Mexico
2004–05 in Costa Rican football
2004–05 in Mexican football
2004–05 in Honduran football
2005 in Cuban sport
2004–05 in Salvadoran football
2005 in Canadian soccer
2005 in American soccer
2005 in Haitian sport
2005 in youth association football